Bank holiday chiefly refers to a public holiday in the UK and Ireland during which banking institutions are closed for business.

Bank holiday may also refer to:

Bank holidays in other countries
 Public holidays in the Australian states of South Australia and Victoria, where all statutory holidays, their substitutes, and Saturdays are legally defined as bank holidays.
 Public holidays in Gibraltar are often referred to as "bank holidays" and used interchangeably, although strictly and legally there is a difference.
 Public holidays in Hong Kong, where the term "bank holiday" is used colloquially to refer to public holidays.
 Bank holidays in India.
 Public holidays in the Republic of Ireland, where "bank holiday" is a colloquial term.
 Federal holidays in the United States.

Business and government
 The emergency holidays declared in the United States prior to the passage of the Emergency Banking Act during the Great Depression in 1933.
 A week-long emergency holiday decreed in March 1999 by the government of Ecuador during that country's 1998-1999 financial crisis, a measure that was followed by the total year-long freeze of all bank deposits.

Art and entertainment
 The Bank Holidays, an Australian indie pop band
 Bank Holiday, a musical composition by Albert Ketèlbey
Bank Holiday Records, record label owned by Lily Allen
 "Bank Holiday", a song by the Britpop band Blur on their album Parklife (1994)
 "Bank Holiday Monday" (song), a song by the Britrock band Stereophonics
 Bank Holiday (film), a 1938 British drama film

See also 
 Holiday (disambiguation)
 Public holiday